The 1565–66 papal conclave (20 December – 7 January) was convened on the death of Pope Pius IV and ended in the election of Pope Pius V.

Background
Cardinal Vitellozzo Vitelli was Camerlengo; Cardinal Francesco Pisani, the most senior of the cardinals was Dean of the Sacred College. The conclave was made up of several small groups aligned either by family relations, such as those who favored Francesco Gonzaga; and by locale, such as the Florentines. A separate division lay between some of the younger cardinals eager to press the reforms of the Council of Trent, and their senior colleagues whose views of reform leaned towards the Inquisition, which use appeared sometimes to border on the political.

Cardinal Electors at the Conclave

Francesco Pisani (1494–1570)
Giovanni Morone (1509–80)
Alessandro Farnese (1520–89)
Cristoforo Madruzzo (1512–78)
Tiberio Crispo (1498-1566)
Niccolò Caetani (1526–85)
Ippolito II d'Este (1509–72)
Giacomo Savelli (1523–87)
Giulio della Rovere (1533–78)
Innocenzo Ciocchi Del Monte (c1532-77)
Fulvio Giulio della Corgna (1517–83)
Giovanni Michele Saraceni (1498-1568)
Giovanni Ricci (1498-1574)
Giovanni Battista Cicala (1510–70)
Luigi Cornaro (1517–84)
Girolamo Simoncelli (1522-1605)
Scipione Rebiba (1504–77)
Jean Suau (1503–66)
Michele Ghislieri (1504–72)
Clemente d'Olera (1501–68)
Vitellozzo Vitelli (1531–68)
Giovanni Antonio Serbelloni (1519–91)
Charles Borromeo (1538–84)
Ludovico Simoneta (d. 1568)
Mark Sittich von Hohenems Altemps (1533–95)
Francesco Gonzaga (1538–66)
Alfonso Gesualdo (1540-1603)
Gianfrancesco Gambara (1533–87)
Bernardo Salviati (1508–68)
Pier Francesco Ferrero (1510–66)
Luigi d'Este (1538–86)
Ludovico Madruzzo (1532-1600)
Innico d'Avalos d'Aragona (1536-1600)
Francisco Pacheco de Villena
Girolamo di Corregio (1511–72)
Ferdinando de' Medici
Marco Antonio Colonna (1523–79)
Tolomeo Gallio (1527-1607)
Angelo Nicolini (1505–67)
Luigi Pisani (1522–70)
Zaccaria Delfino (1527–84)
Marcantonio Bobba (d. 1575)
Alessandro Sforza (1534–81)
Flavio Orsini (1532-1581)
Francesco Alciati (1522–80)
Francesco Abbondio Castiglioni (1523–68)
Guido Luca Ferrero (1537–85)
Benedetto Lomellini (1517–79)
Guglielmo Sirleto (1514–85)
Gabriele Paleotti (1522–97)
Francesco Crasso (1500–66)

References

1565 in the Papal States
1566 in the Papal States
16th-century elections
1565 in politics
1566 in politics
1565
1565 in Europe
1566 in Europe
16th-century Catholicism